Nikkel is a surname. Notable people with the surname include:

 B.J. Nikkel, American politician
 Marc Nikkel (1950–2000), American priest

Russian Mennonite surnames